Carpodectes is a genus of passerine birds in the family Cotingidae.

It contains the following species:

References

 
Bird genera
 
Taxa named by Osbert Salvin
Taxonomy articles created by Polbot